Ditto is a rural settlement in the Port-au-Prince Arrondissement, in the Ouest department of Haiti.

See also
Kenscoff

References

Populated places in Ouest (department)